Lake Denton is a  lake in Highlands County in the U.S. state of Florida. It is between the cities of Avon Park and Sebring. Divers use the lake for recreation and training. Lake Denton Camp, run by Lake Denton Management Inc. is located on its shore. The property Lake Denton Camp is located on is owned by The Orange Blossom Baptist Association.

Lake Denton has a public boat ramp, but no public swimming areas.  In recent years, a conflict has arisen between those wanting to use the lake for boating and those wanting to use it for swimming.  In summer 2005, the boat ramp was officially closed, temporarily, so people could use Lake Denton for swimming.  The future will determine whether boating and swimming will both be allowed, depending on how the Highlands County Commission decides to respond to conflicts between area residents and lake visitors. It is now open for boaters, although the conflict over its recreational use has not been resolved.

References
 Florida Lakewatch
Phil Attinger, "County to Discuss More About Denton," The News-Sun (Sebring, FL), September 11, 2005, p. 2A.
 http://www.shorediving.com/Earth/USA_East/Florida/Lake_Denton/index.htm
 Lake Denton Camp Website

Denton
Denton